Hispanic Journal of Behavioral Sciences is a peer-reviewed academic journal. The journal's editor is Amado M. Padilla (Stanford University). It has been in publication since 1979 and is currently published by SAGE Publications.

Abstracting and indexing 
Hispanic Journal of Behavioral Sciences is abstracted and indexed in, among other databases:  SCOPUS, and the Social Sciences Citation Index. According to the Journal Citation Reports, its 2017 impact factor is 0.864, ranking it 95 out of 135 journals in the category ‘Psychology, Multidisciplinary’.

References

External links 
 

SAGE Publishing academic journals
English-language journals